Chromium(III) fluoride is the name for the inorganic compounds with the chemical formula CrF3 as well as several related hydrates.  The compound CrF3 is a green crystalline solid that is insoluble in common solvents, but the coloured hydrates [Cr(H2O)6]F3 and [Cr(H2O)6]F3•3H2O are soluble in water.  The trihydrate is green, and the hexahydrate is violet. The anhydrous form sublimes at 1100–1200 °C.

Structures
Like almost all compounds of chromium(III), these compounds feature octahedral Cr centres.  In the anhydrous form, the six coordination sites are occupied by fluoride ligands that bridge to adjacent Cr centres.  In the hydrates, some or all of the fluoride ligands are replaced by water.

Production
Chromium(III) fluoride is produced from the reaction of chromium(III) oxide and hydrofluoric acid:
Cr2O3 + 6 HF  +  9 H2O → 2 [Cr(H2O)6]F3

The anhydrous form is produced from hydrogen fluoride and chromic chloride:
CrCl3 + 3 HF  → CrF3  + 3 HCl

Another method of synthesis of CrF3 involves thermal decomposition of (NH3)CrF6:
(NH4)3CrF6  →  CrF3  + 3NH3 +  3HF
A mixed valence Cr2F5 is also known.

Uses
Chromium(III) fluoride finds some applications as a mordant in textiles and as a corrosion inhibitor. Chromium(III) fluoride catalyzes the fluorination of chlorocarbons by HF.

References

Fluorides
Metal halides
Chromium(III) compounds